Jesse James at Bay is a 1941 American Western film directed by Joseph Kane starring Roy Rogers and George "Gabby" Hayes.

Plot
When Jesse learns that crooked banker Krager is cheating settlers, he and his gang rob trains to obtain cash for them to purchase their land. Krager, finding a Jesse look-alike in Clint Burns, hires him to wreak havoc on the ranchers pretending to be the fearsome outlaw. When Jesse confronts and kills Burns, he switches clothes and goes after the crooked gang.

Cast
 Roy Rogers as Jesse James/Clint Burns
 George 'Gabby' Hayes as Sheriff Gabby Whitaker
 Sally Payne as Polly Morgan
 Pierre Watkin as Phineas Krager – Land Dealer
 Ivan Miller as Judge Rutherford
 Hal Taliaferro as Paul Sloan, Lawyer
 Gale Storm as Jane Fillmore, 'St. Louis Journal' Reporter
 Roy Barcroft as Henchman Vern Stone
 Jack Kirk as Henchman Rufe Balder
 Edward Peil Sr. as Marshal (uncredited)

Soundtrack
 Roy Rogers – "You for Me" (Written by Sol Meyer)
 Roy Rogers – "The Old Chisholm Trail" (Traditional)

External links

 
 

1941 films
1941 Western (genre) films
American Western (genre) films
American black-and-white films
Biographical films about Jesse James
Films scored by Paul Sawtell
Republic Pictures films
Films directed by Joseph Kane
1940s English-language films
1940s American films